The 1990–91 Serie A season was the 57th season of the Serie A, the top level of ice hockey in Italy. 10 teams participated in the league, and HC Milan won the championship.

First round

Final round

Relegation round

External links
 Season on hockeyarchives.info

1990-91
Italy
1990–91 in Italian ice hockey